David Fernández Tercero (born 25 March 1973 in San José) is a retired Costa Rican judoka, who competed in the men's extra lightweight category. Fernandez represented Costa Rica at the 2004 Summer Olympics in Athens, where he was appointed as the nation's flag bearer by the National Olympic Committee in the opening ceremony. He qualified for the men's extra lightweight class (60 kg) by receiving an invitation from the International Judo Federation through a wild card entry. Fernandez ousted early in the opening match to Mexico's Cristobal Aburto, who scored two kokas and a seoi nage (shoulder throw) within a span of nearly three minutes.

References

External links

1973 births
Living people
Costa Rican male judoka
Olympic judoka of Costa Rica
Judoka at the 2004 Summer Olympics
Sportspeople from San José, Costa Rica
21st-century Costa Rican people